Eskerkhan Madiev (born 12 February 1998) is a Georgian boxer of Chechen descent. He competed in the men's welterweight event at the 2020 Summer Olympics, representing Georgia.

References

External links
 

1998 births
Living people
Male boxers from Georgia (country)
Olympic boxers of Georgia (country)
Boxers at the 2020 Summer Olympics
People from Achkhoy-Martanovsky District
European Games competitors for Georgia (country)
Boxers at the 2019 European Games
21st-century people from Georgia (country)